William Collins (born November 20, 1950) is an American sprinter, originally running for Mount Vernon High School in Westchester County, New York, where he won four state titles and later at Texas Christian University where he achieved "All-American" status.

Biography
In 1976 he managed to make the finals in the 100 metres at the United States Olympic Trials, finishing last which qualified him for the relay pool, though he never ran in the Olympics.  He did make the USA 4x100 relay team that won the gold medal at the first ever 1977 IAAF World Cup.  That team's 38.03 was the world record in the event for almost 6 years.  He was ranked #7 in the US top ten at 200 metres in 1977 and 1975  At 100 metres he was near the bottom of the top ten 1974-1976

At the international Pacific Conference Games he won the 1977 gold medal at 200 metres, the silver at 100 metres and was on the gold medal-winning 4 x 100 metres relay.

Collins holds five current Masters World Records, including three age groups of the 100 metres. Younger athletes who train with him and his Houston Elite Track Club at Rice University refer to him as "Superman."  Indoors and outdoors, he has won numerous World and National Championships. In a class by himself he is rarely beaten, except when injured.

In 2003 he was voted into the Masters Division of the National Track and Field Hall of Fame.  Geezerjock Magazine name him their inaugural "Geezerjock of the Year" in 2005.  In 2007 he was named "World Masters Athletics Masters Athlete of the Year" which was presented at the IAAF gala in Monaco.

At his first major meet after turning 60, Collins set the world indoor record in the M60 200 metres and 400 metres.  He was named USATF "Athlete of the Week" amongst all age divisions.  He had received the same citation almost exactly five years earlier after his first major competition after entering the previous age division and setting world records.

He co-authored, with Rick Riddle a book on Masters sprinting, "The Ageless Athletic Spirit:  Training with a World Champion"

In 2011, Collins suffered paralysis to his legs, rendering him unable to walk.  It was later diagnosed as Guillain–Barré syndrome.  As inexplicable as the disease's cause, was his recovery.  After spending the 2011 season (when the World Masters Athletics Championships were held in the United States) in a wheelchair, in early 2012 "Superman" came roaring back to set a new indoor world record in the M60 60 metres at the USA Indoor Masters Championships.

References

External links
 
 

1950 births
American male sprinters
American track and field coaches
World record holders in masters athletics
TCU Horned Frogs men's track and field athletes
Rice University people
Track and field athletes from New York (state)
American masters athletes
Living people
Sportspeople from Mount Vernon, New York
Athletes (track and field) at the 1975 Pan American Games
People with Guillain–Barré syndrome
Pan American Games gold medalists for the United States
Pan American Games medalists in athletics (track and field)
Medalists at the 1975 Pan American Games
Mount Vernon High School (New York) alumni